
Gmina Wielgie is a rural gmina (administrative district) in Lipno County, Kuyavian-Pomeranian Voivodeship, in north-central Poland.

Villages
Gmina Wielgie contains the villages and settlements of Bętlewo, Czarne, Czerskie Rumunki, Nowa Wieś, Oleszno, Piaseczno, Płonczyn, Rumunki Tupadelskie, Suradówek, Suszewo, Teodorowo, Tupadły, Wielgie, Witkowo, Zaduszniki, Zakrzewo and Złowody.

Neighbouring gminas
Gmina Wielgie is bordered by the gminas of Dobrzyń nad Wisłą, Fabianki, Lipno, Skępe and Tłuchowo.

References
Polish official population figures 2006

Wielgie
Lipno County